, son of regent Kujō Michiie, was a Japanese kugyō (court noble) of the Kamakura period (1185–1333) of Japan. He held a regent position kampaku two times from 1242 to 1246 and from 1261 to 1265. He was the father of Nijō Morotada.

References
 

1216 births
1270 deaths
Fujiwara clan
Yoshizane
People of Kamakura-period Japan